Le Propagateur Catholique ("The Catholic Propagator") was a 19th-century American, French-language, Roman Catholic newspaper.  It was founded in 1842 at the newspaper of the Archdiocese of New Orleans by Archbishop Napoléon-Joseph Perché. The first editor was Adrien Rouquette. Le Propagateur was published until 1888.

References 

Roman Catholic Archdiocese of New Orleans
Catholic newspapers published in the United States
French-American culture in Louisiana
French-language newspapers published in the United States
Newspapers published in New Orleans
1842 establishments in the United States
Newspapers established in 1842
1888 disestablishments in the United States
Non-English-language newspapers published in Louisiana
Publications disestablished in 1888
Defunct newspapers published in Louisiana